Joseph Anthony Didulica (born 14 October 1977) is a Croatian Australian former footballer who played as a goalkeeper. On 11 October 2011 he ended his career after ongoing neck and head complaints.

Club career
Didulica was born in Geelong, Victoria to a Croatian father, Luka, and a Croatian-Australian mother, Mary. He also has an older brother, John and sister, Trish. His father emigrated to Australia from Poličnik, a village in northern Dalmatia, about 10 kilometres outside of Zadar.

Didulica started to play football in the North Geelong Warriors. In 1996, he moved to the Melbourne Knights, a club whose team primarily consists of Australian Croats, and played for them until 1999. Then he transferred to Ajax Amsterdam, whence he was first loaned to Belgian side Germinal Beerschot for a couple of months in 2001 before eventually moving to Austria Vienna in 2003. After spending three seasons as a regular in goal for Austria Wien, Didulica returned to the Netherlands and was signed by AZ Alkmaar. He made seven Eredivisie appearances with the club before being forced to take a longer break following a brain concussion he sustained in a league match against PSV Eindhoven in October 2006 after being hit with the ball in his head from a shot by PSV's Australian international Jason Čulina.

On 24 April 2006, an Austrian court sentenced Didulica to a fine of €60,000 on the count of physical injury resulting from negligence, for slamming Rapid Wien's Axel Lawaree at a Vienna derby in May 2005.

In June 2007, Didulica successfully appealed the decision of the lower court to the  High Court of Vienna. The original charges against Didulica were quashed and he was acquitted of everything, the Court ruling Didulica had played the ball, not acted unreasonably and did not intend to cause injury to the opponent.

On 11 October 2011, Didulica announced his retirement from football due to his persistent neck and head injuries.

International career
In 2000, Didulica was selected to the Australian squad for the Sydney Olympics, but had to withdraw due to injury and never received an international cap for the Australian national team at A-level. In 2004, he decided to play for the country of his parents. According to Didulica, his decision was based on the fact that he had not been selected to represent Australia by then coach Frank Farina. Additionally, Australia had not qualified for a World Cup for around 30 years and he saw more opportunities for success with Croatia, who qualified for both World Cups they entered at the time.

Didulica made his debut for the Croatian national team in a friendly match against Macedonia on 28 April 2004 in Skopje and was subsequently selected to be part of the Croatian team at the Euro 2004 finals, where he served as the second-choice goalkeeper without making an appearance. He was a member of the Croatian team in both the qualifying and finals of the 2006 World Cup, but did not play a single minute during the competitions as Tomislav Butina played eight of ten qualifiers and was replaced in the remaining two qualifiers by Stipe Pletikosa, who also played every minute in all three games at the finals. In more than two years of being part of the Croatian national team, Didulica only made four appearances in friendly matches, against Macedonia, Korea Republic, Hong Kong and Austria. Just a month after the end of the 2006 World Cup, Didulica announced his retirement from international football with an explanation that he wants to concentrate more on his club career.

Honours

Club honours 
Ajax
 Eredivisie: 2001–02
 KNVB Cup: 2001–02

Austria Wien
 Austrian Bundesliga: 2005–06
 Austrian Cup: 2004–05, 2005–06

AZ
 Eredivisie: 2008–09
 Johan Cruyff Shield: 2009

References

External links 
 AZ Alkmaar profile
 Oz Football profile
 

1977 births
Living people
Sportspeople from Geelong
Soccer players from Victoria (Australia)
Australian people of Croatian descent
Australian emigrants to Croatia
Citizens of Croatia through descent
Association football goalkeepers
Australian soccer players
Australia under-23 international soccer players
Croatian footballers
Croatia international footballers
UEFA Euro 2004 players
2006 FIFA World Cup players
North Geelong Warriors FC players
Melbourne Knights FC players
AFC Ajax players
Beerschot A.C. players
FK Austria Wien players
AZ Alkmaar players
National Soccer League (Australia) players
Eredivisie players
Belgian Pro League players
Austrian Football Bundesliga players
Croatian expatriate footballers
Australian expatriate soccer players
Expatriate footballers in the Netherlands
Australian expatriate sportspeople in the Netherlands
Croatian expatriate sportspeople in the Netherlands
Expatriate footballers in Belgium
Australian expatriate sportspeople in Belgium
Croatian expatriate sportspeople in Belgium
Expatriate footballers in Austria
Australian expatriate sportspeople in Austria
Croatian expatriate sportspeople in Austria
Melbourne City FC non-playing staff
Association football goalkeeping coaches